Ralph Emerson Campbell (May 9, 1867 – January 9, 1921) was a United States district judge of the United States District Court for the Eastern District of Oklahoma.

Education and career

Born in Butler County, Pennsylvania, Campbell received a Bachelor of Science degree from Northern Indiana Normal School (now Valparaiso University) in 1891, an Artium Baccalaureus degree from the same institution the following year, and a Bachelor of Laws from the University of Kansas School of Law in 1894. He was an assistant general solicitor for the Choctaw, Oklahoma and Gulf Railroad in the Indian Territory and Arkansas from 1895 to 1901, and general attorney of Choctaw, Oklahoma and Gulf Railroad in the Oklahoma Territory from 1901 to 1903. In 1902, he was elected president of the Oklahoma Territorial Bar Association, and leader of the Oklahoma Territorial delegation to the 1904 Republican convention, which strongly supported Theodore Roosevelt's nomination for president. He was in private practice in South McAlester (now McAlester), Indian Territory (State of Oklahoma from November 16, 1907) from 1905 to 1907.

Federal judicial service
Frank Frantz, the last Republican Territorial governor was an old friend of Theodore Roosevelt from the San Juan Hill campaign in the Spanish-American War. Ralph Campbell, as chairman of the 1908 Republican convention, had been a staunch supporter of Frantz at the convention. Frantz therefore strongly recommended that Roosevelt nominate Campbell as judge for the Eastern District of Oklahoma. On November 11, 1907, Campbell received a recess appointment from President Theodore Roosevelt to a new seat on the United States District Court for the Eastern District of Oklahoma created by 34 Stat. 276. Formally nominated to the same position by President Roosevelt on December 3, 1907, he was confirmed by the United States Senate on January 13, 1908, and received his commission the same day. Campbell served in that capacity until August 31, 1918, when he resigned.

Later career and death

Following his resignation from the federal bench, Campbell resumed private practice with the law firm of Cosden and Company in Tulsa, Oklahoma from 1918 to 1921. He died in Tulsa on January 9, 1921.

In his book, The Federal Courts of the Tenth Circuit: A History, author James K. Logan states that Judge Campbell killed himself by a gunshot in his office on a Sunday morning. Campbell left no message concerning why he took the action. He had no known enemies, was not involved in any scandal, and his excellent personal reputation is still excellent in the 21st Century.

References

Sources
 

1867 births
1921 deaths
Judges of the United States District Court for the Eastern District of Oklahoma
United States district court judges appointed by Theodore Roosevelt
20th-century American judges
People from Butler County, Pennsylvania
University of Kansas School of Law alumni
People from McAlester, Oklahoma
Lawyers from Tulsa, Oklahoma
American politicians who committed suicide